Pandion is a genus of birds of prey, known as ospreys, the only genus of family Pandionidae. Most taxonomic treatments have regarded this genus as describing a single extant species, separated to subspecies or races, while some treatments recognize two extant species. 

The population found at the coastline and islands of Australia and southeast Asia, and the Indonesian archipelago have also been described as Pandion haliaetus cristatus.

Species
Extant species:

Extinct species:
 Pandion homalopteron Warter 1976
 Pandion lovensis Becker 1985

References

 
Monogeneric vertebrate families
Bird genera with one living species